Kalunga railway station is a railway station on the South Eastern Railway network in the state of Odisha, India. It serves Kalunga village. Its code is KLG. It has three platforms. Passenger, Express and Superfast trains halt at Kalunga railway station.

Major Trains

 Tapaswini Express
 Samaleshwari Express

See also
 Sundergarh district

References

Railway stations in Sundergarh district
Chakradharpur railway division